Tmesipteris, the hanging fork ferns, is a genus of ferns, one of two genera in the family Psilotaceae, order Psilotales (the other being Psilotum).
Tmesipteris is restricted to certain lands in the Southern Pacific, notably Australia, New Zealand and New Caledonia.
In New Zealand this hanging epiphyte is common in the warm temperate rain forests of both main islands, where it can normally be found as short spiky dark-green fronds (10–15 cm long), often with lighter bag-like sporangia at the bases of some of its "leaves".  The plant possesses no true leaves; what appear to be leaves are flattened stems.  The fronds emerge directly from the fibrous root-mats which clad the trunks of mature tree ferns such as Dicksonia and Cyathea. Tmesipteris is from the Greek language, meaning a "cut fern", referring to the truncated leaf tips.

Species
Species include:

Tmesipteris elongata P.A.Dang - from Australia (Victoria and Tasmania) and New Zealand (North Island, South Island, Stewart Island, Chatham Islands)
Tmesipteris gracilis Chinnock 2003
Tmesipteris horomaka Perrie, Brownsey & Lovis - New Zealand (Banks Peninsula)
Tmesipteris lanceolata P.A.Dang. - from New Caledonia and New Zealand (presumed extinct in Queensland).
Tmesipteris norfolkensis P.S.Green - Hanging Fork-fern
Tmesipteris obliqua Chinnock - Long Fork-fern
Tmesipteris oblongifolia A.F.Braithw. 1986
Tmesipteris ovata N.A.Wakef. - Oval Fork-fern
Tmesipteris parva N.A.Wakef. - Small Fork-fern
Tmesipteris sigmatifolia Chinn. - from New Caledonia and New Zealand
Tmesipteris solomonensis Braithwaite 1973
Tmesipteris tannensis (Spreng.) Bernh. - New Zealand
Tmesipteris truncata (R.Br.) Desv. New South Wales & Queensland (Australia)
Tmesipteris vanuatensis Braithwaite 1986
Tmesipteris vieillardii P.A.Dang - from New Caledonia
Tmesipteris zamorae Gruèzo & Amoroso, 2012 - from Philippines

Phylogeny
Nitta et al. 2022 and Fern Tree of life

References

Bierhorst, D W (1977) The Systematic Position of Psilotum and Tmesipteris, Brittonia (New York Botanical Garden Press)
Qiu, Y-L and Palmer, J (1999) Phylogeny of early land plants: insights from genes and genomes. Trends in Plant Science 4 (1), 26-30

Psilotaceae
Epiphytes
Fern genera